Kerman Province (Ostān-e Kermān) is the largest province of the 31 provinces of Iran. It is in the southeast of Iran, with its capital in the city of Kerman. In 2014 it was placed in Region 5.

At the time of the National Census of 2006, the population of the province was 2,584,834 in 612,996 households. The following census in 2011 counted 2,938,988 people (1,482,339 male and 1,456,649 female) in 785,747 households. Urban areas accounted for 1,684,982 people, whereas 1,242,344 lived in rural vicinities; 6,082 were non-residents. By the time of the 2016 census, the population had increased to 3,164,718 in 932,721 households. The capital city of Kerman, at a population of 537,718, comprises about 29% of the urban population of 1.85 million, being the most developed and largest city of the province.

Geography

The altitudes and heights of the province are the continuation of the central mountain ranges of Iran. They extend from the volcanic folds beginning in Azarbaijan and, by branching out in the central plateau of Iran, terminate in Baluchestan. These mountain ranges have brought about vast plains in the province. The Bashagard and Kuhbonan Mountains are the highest in this region and include peaks such as Toghrol, Aljerd, Palvar, Sirach, Abareq and Tahrood. Other ranges that stretch out from Yazd to Kerman and Challeh-ye-Jazmoorian include high peaks like Hazaran 4501 meters above sea level, Kuh-e Shah 4402 meters, Joupar, Bahr Aseman and Khabr mountain in Khabr National Park and others.

Most of the province is largely steppe or sandy desert, although there are some oases where dates, oranges (said to be the best in Iran), and pistachios are cultivated. In antiquity "Carmanian" wine was famed for its quality [Strabo XV.2.14 (cap. 726)]. The province is dependent on qanats (underground water channels) for its irrigation. In the central parts, Mount Hezar is the highest peak, 4501 meters above sea level.

Kerman is prone to natural disasters. A recent flood for example, unearthed the archeological ancient city of Jiroft, in the south of Kerman province. Arg-é Bam on the other hand, the world's largest adobe structure, was destroyed in an earthquake in December 2003. On February 22, 2005, a major earthquake killed hundreds of residents in the town of Zarand and several nearby villages in north Kerman (see 2005 Zarand earthquake).

History
According to a text from the 8th century commontly attributed to the Armenian historian Movses Khorenatsi, present-day Kerman Province was situated in the southern quarter of the Sasanian Empire. The main city of the region from the Sasanian era to the 10th century was Sirjan.

Early Muslim geographers considered the area as part of the hot climatic zone and the mountainous interior as home of predatory people including the Kufečs (or Kofejān). Hamdallah Mustawfi stated that predatory beasts roamed the area which by then had undergone forestation.

In the 13th century it came under the rule of the Qutlugh-Khanids founded by ethnic Khitans, than under the Mongol empire. It was under the Timurid empire in 15th century.

Administrative divisions

Cities 

According to the 2016 census, 1,858,587 people (over 58% of the population of Kerman province) live in the following cities: Aminshahr 4,413, Anar 15,532, Anbarabad 18,185, Anduhjerd 4,041, Arzuiyeh 6,868, Baft 34,517, Baghin 10,407, Bahreman 5,265, Balvard 3,534, Bam 127,396, Baravat 22,761, Bardsir 25,152, Bezenjan 4,517, Boluk 5,304, Chatrud 5,860, Darb-e Behesht 10,670, Dashtkar 3,234, Dehaj 5,045, Dow Sari 4,130, Ekhtiarabad 9,840, Fahraj 6,876, Faryab 4,863, Golbaf 9,205, Golzar 5,445, Gonbaki 7,210, Hamashahr 3,311, Hanza 1,452, Hojedk 1,007, Jebalbarez 6,750, Jiroft 130,429, Jowzam 3,436, Jupar 3,607, Kahnuj 52,624, Kazemabad 4,060, Kerman 537,718, Khanuk 2,628, Khatunabad 5,471, Khursand 8,252, Khvajeh Shahr 2,478, Kian Shahr 4,543, Koshkuiyeh 7,644, Kuhbanan 10,761, Lalehzar 4,429, Mahan 19,423, Manujan 15,634, Mardehek 2,870, Mes-e Sarcheshmeh 5,967, Mohammadabad 20,720, Mohiabad 3,930, Najafabad 20,164, Narmashir 5,222, Negar 7,600, Nezamshahr 2,426, Nowdezh 5,562, Qaleh Ganj 13,169, Pariz 8,005, Rabor 13,263, Rafsanjan 161,909, Ravar 22,729, Rayen 10,286, Reyhan Shahr 4,580, Rudbar 14,747, Safayyeh 2,478, Shahdad 5,217, Shahr-e Babak 51,620, Sirjan 199,704, Yazdan Shahr 5,607, Zangiabad 8,568, Zarand 60,370, Zeh-e Kalut 6,835, and Zeydabad 9,112.

Most populous cities 
The following sorted table, lists the most populous cities in Kerman.

Language 
The main languages of Kerman Province are Persian and Garmsiri. Smaller languages include Achomi, Turkic dialects and a Median-type dialect spoken by the Jewish and Zoroastrian communities.

The Persian varieties can be considered one single Kermani accent and they are sufficiently close to Standard Persian which they share intelligibility with.

Economy
As of 1920, the province was known for the quality of its caraway. Today, Kerman is where a large portion of Iran's auto industry is based. Sirjan, a specially designated economic zone, is considered a passageway for transfer of imported commercial goods from the south (through the Persian Gulf). Arg e Jadid, is another specially designated economic zone of Iran, located in Kerman province. Furthermore, Kerman Province is famous for its abundance of pistachio fields both in the city itself and surrounding ones such as Rafsanjan, Ravar and Nooq.

The Gol Gohar mine, the largest iron mine in Iran, is located in Kerman province.

Education

Colleges and universities
Kerman province contains the following universities:
 Jiroft University
 Kerman University of Medical Sciences
 Rafsanjan University of Medical Sciences
 Shahid Bahonar University of Kerman
 Sirjan University of Technology
 ValiAsr University of Rafsanjan

See also
 Kirman (Sasanian province)
  (related to the Islamic Consultative Assembly)
 
 Carmania (satrapy)
 Dalfard

References

External links

 
  (Bibliography)
Kerman Specially Designated Economic Zone

 
Provinces of Iran